The Channels were an American doo wop group from New York City.

History 
An R&B/soul group of the 1950s, The Channels formed in 1955 around the singers Larry Hampden, Billy Morris, and Edward Dolphin; they started as a quintet with two additional part-time members, but soon after they permanently added Earl Michael Lewis and Clifton Wright, formerly of The Lotharios. Lewis was the group's main songwriter, writing (among others) their regional hit "The Closer You Are" (1956).

The Channels recorded for record labels Gone, Fury, Port, Hit, Enjoy, and Groove. The lineup changed several times over the course of the group's lifetime. They enjoyed significant regional success on the East Coast but never charted a major nationwide hit.

Other notable (though not nationally charted) singles include "Bye Bye Baby" b/w "My Love Will Never Die," "That's My Desire," "The Gleam in Your Eye," "Anything You Do," and "You Can Count On Me."

Legacy 
"The Closer You Are" was included in Robert Christgau's "Basic Record Library" of 1950s and 1960s recordings, published in Christgau's Record Guide: Rock Albums of the Seventies (1981).

Frank Zappa recorded "The Closer You Are" on his album Them or Us (1984).

References

External links 
 The Channels at Discogs

Doo-wop groups
Musical groups from New York (state)
Fire Records artists